The Gnostic Apocalypse of Peter is the third tractate in Codex VII of the Nag Hammadi library and part of the New Testament apocrypha. It is also known as the Coptic Apocalypse of Peter or Revelation of Peter. The Coptic manuscript is considered a poor translation of a Greek original that dates to c. 200 AD. Translator James Brashler considers the text "important source material for a Gnostic Christology that understands Jesus as a docetic redeemer," based on a vision near the end of the text in which Jesus states that a substitute was crucified rather than the living Jesus. Comparable language is used in the Second Treatise of the Great Seth, in which Jesus laughs at the ignorance of those who tried to kill him but failed to realize that he "did not die in reality but in appearance." Docetism was later rejected at the First Council of Nicaea in 325 AD and regarded as heretical by most non-Gnostic churches. The text also emphasizes seeking truth and knowledge, because many people will be misled by false teachers.

Summary
In the opening of the text, Jesus is sitting in the temple and talking to Peter about the importance of righteousness and knowledge. Peter envisions that the priests and the people may try to kill them. Jesus tells Peter to put his hands over his own eyes and see the truth. When Peter does so, he sees a new light and Jesus explains to him the blindness of the priests and the people. Jesus instructs Peter to listen to what the priests and the people are saying, and Peter says that they are praising Jesus. Jesus states that many people will initially accept the teachings but will turn away due to the will of the Father of their error. 

Jesus continues, saying the guileless and pure will be pushed towards death, while those who have been contaminated by false teachings will be prisoners. Some will proclaim evil teachings and say evil things against each other, and they will be named as those who stand in the strength of the archons. These people will ask about dreams and will be given perdition instead of incorruption. The text emphasizes that evil cannot produce good fruit and that the soul is always a slave to its desires. On the other hand, the immortal souls resemble mortal ones but do not reveal their nature, and are in the life of immortality. What does not exist will dissolve into non-existence, and the deaf and blind will only join with their own kind.

The text describes the actions and attitudes of different groups of people, who either misunderstand or deliberately spread false information about spiritual truths. Some individuals will be arrogant and envious, spreading lies and haughtiness about the truth. Others will be involved in error and deceit, setting up false laws and harsh fates. There will also be those who pretend to have authority from God and oppress others, but they will be cast into darkness. The text discusses "little ones," referring to the innocent and the ignorant who are misled by these false teachers. A time is determined for these false leaders to rule over the little ones, but eventually, the error will be completed and the little ones will rule over their oppressors. The Savior tells Peter not to be afraid, as those who bring judgment will come and put the false teachers to shame. Peter will stand in their midst and the invisible one has opposed the false leaders, whose minds will be closed.

Peter has a vision of the crucifixion of Jesus. The vision reveals to Peter that the physical form of Jesus being crucified is not the true form of Jesus but only a substitute. The real Jesus is the spiritual being who is filled with a Holy Spirit and is joyful. This Jesus is seen as the intellectual Pleroma, which is united with the Holy Spirit and the perfect light. The text also reveals that the teachings of this vision should be presented to those of a different race, those who are not of this world. Finally, the text encourages Peter to be courageous and not to fear, since Jesus will be with him. After this vision, Peter comes back to reality.

References 

Christian apocalyptic writings
Peter, Gnostic
Peter
Petrine-related books
Coptic literature
2nd-century Christian texts
Nag Hammadi library

pl:Apokalipsa Piotra